Jahanara Begum (23 March 1614 – 16 September 1681) was a Mughal princess and later the Padshah Begum of the Mughal Empire from 1631 to 1658 and again from 1668 until her death. She was the second and the eldest surviving child of Emperor Shah Jahan and Mumtaz Mahal.

After Mumtaz Mahal's untimely death in 1631, the 17-year-old Jahanara was entrusted with the charge of the royal seal and conferred the title of Padshah Begum (First lady) of the Mughal Empire, despite the fact that her father had three surviving wives. She was Shah Jahan's favourite daughter, wielded major political influence during her father's reign, and has been described as "the most powerful woman in the empire" at the time.

Jahanara was an ardent partisan of her brother, Dara Shikoh, and supported him as her father's chosen successor. During the war of succession which took place after Shah Jahan's illness in 1657, Jahanara sided with the heir-apparent Dara and joined her father in Agra Fort, where he had been placed under house arrest by Aurangzeb. A devoted daughter, she took care of Shah Jahan till his death in 1666. Later, Jahanara reconciled with Aurangzeb who gave her the title 'Empress of Princesses' and replaced her younger sister, Princess Roshanara Begum, as the First Lady. Jahanara died unmarried during Aurangzeb's reign.
Jahanara wrote 'Munis al arwah' (Confidant of spirits) which is the biography of Shaikh Muinuddin Chisti.

Early life and education
Jahanara's early education was entrusted to Sati al-Nisa Khanam, the sister to Jahangir's poet laureate, Talib Amuli. Sati al-Nisa was known for her knowledge of the Qur'an and Persian literature, as well as for her knowledge of etiquette, housekeeping, and medicine. She also served as principal lady-in-waiting to her mother, Mumtaz Mahal.

Many of the women in the imperial household were accomplished at reading, writing poetry and painting. They also played chess, polo and hunted outdoors. The women had access to the late Emperor Akbar's library, full of books on world religions, and Persian, Turkish and Indian literature. Jahanara was no exception.

Upon the death of Mumtaz Mahal in 1631, Jahanara, aged 17, took the place of her mother as First Lady of the Empire, despite her father having three other wives. In addition to caring for her younger brothers and sisters, she was also a good caretaker of her father.

One of her tasks after the death of her mother was to oversee, with the help of Sati al-Nisa, the betrothal and wedding of her brother, Dara Shikoh to Nadira Banu Begum, which was originally planned by Mumtaz Mahal, but postponed by her death.

Her father frequently took her advice and entrusted her with the charge of the Imperial Seal. As French traveller and physician François Bernier writes in his memoirs,Travels in the Mogul Empire,“Shah Jahan reposed unbounded confidence in his favourite child; she watched over his safety, and so cautiously observant, that no dish was permitted to appear upon the royal table which had not been prepared under her superintendence.”In 1644, when Aurangzeb angered his father, the Badshah, Jahanara interceded on her brother’s behalf and convinced Shah Jahan to pardon him and restore his rank. Shah Jahan's fondness for his daughter was reflected in the multiple titles that he bestowed upon her, which included: Sahibat al-Zamani (Lady of the Age), Padishah Begum (Lady Emperor), and Begum Sahib (Princess of Princesses).
Her power was such that, unlike the other imperial princesses, she was allowed to live in her own palace, outside the confines of the Agra Fort.

In March 1644, just days after her thirtieth birthday, Jahanara suffered serious burns on her body and almost died of her injuries. Shah Jahan ordered that vast sums of alms be given to the poor, prisoners be released, and prayers offered for the recovery of the princess. Aurangzeb, Murad, and Shaista Khan returned to Delhi to see her. Accounts differ as to what happened. Some say Jahanara's garments, doused in fragrant perfume oils, caught fire. Other accounts assert that the princess' favorite dancing woman's dress caught fire and the princess, coming to her aid, burnt herself on the chest.

During her illness, Shah Jahan was so concerned about the welfare of his favourite daughter, that he made only brief appearances at his daily durbar in the Diwan-i-Am. Royal physicians failed to heal Jahanara's burns. A Persian doctor came to treat her, and her condition improved for a number of months, but then, there was no further improvement until a royal page named Arif Chela mixed an ointment that, after two more months, finally caused the wounds to close. A year after the accident, Jahanara fully recovered.

After the accident, the princess went on a pilgrimage to Moinuddin Chishti’s shrine in Ajmer.

After her recovery, Shah Jahan gave Jahanara rare gems and jewellery, and bestowed upon her the revenues of the port of Surat. She later visited Ajmer, following the example set by her great-grandfather Akbar.

Wealth and charity 
In honor of his coronation, on 6 February 1628, Shah Jahan awarded his wife, Mumtaz Mahal, Jahanara's mother, 100,000 ashrafis (Persian gold coins worth two Mohurs), 600,000 rupees and an annual privy purse of one million rupees. Jahanara received 100,000 ashrafis, 400,000 rupees and an annual grant of 600,000. Upon Mumtaz Mahal's death, her personal fortune was divided by Shah Jahan between Jahanara Begum (who received half) and the rest of Mumtaz Mahal's surviving children.

Jahanara was allotted income from a number of villages and owned several gardens including, Bagh-i-Jahanara, Bagh-i-Nur and Bagh-i-Safa. "Her jagir included the villages of Achchol, Farjahara and the Sarkars of Bachchol, Safapur and Doharah. The pargana of Panipat was also granted to her." As mentioned above, she was also given the prosperous city of Surat.

Her great-grandmother, Mariam-uz-Zamani established an international trading business in the Mughal Empire and owned several ships for the trading purpose like Rahīmī and Ganj-I-Sawai, which dealt between Surat and the Red Sea for the trade of silk, indigo and several other spices. Nur Jahan continued the business, trading in indigo and cloth. Later, Jahanara continued the tradition. She owned a number of ships and maintained trade relations with the English and the Dutch.

Jahanara was known for her active participation in looking after the poor and financing the building of mosques. When her ship, the Sahibi was to set sail for its first journey (on 29 October 1643), she ordered that the ship make its voyage to Mecca and Medina and, "... that every year, fifty koni (One Koni was 4 Muns or 151 pounds) of rice should be sent by the ship for distribution among the destitute and needy of Mecca."

As the de facto Primary Queen of the Mughal empire, Jahanara was responsible for charitable donations. She organized almsgiving on important state and religious days, supported famine relief and pilgrimages to Mecca.

Jahanara made important financial contributions in the support of learning and arts. She supported the publication of a series of works on Islamic mysticism, including commentaries on Rumi's Mathnavi, a very popular mystical work in Mughal India.

Sufism 
Along with her brother Dara Shikoh, she was a disciple of Mullah Shah Badakhshi, who initiated her into the Qadiriyya Sufi order in 1641. Jahanara Begum made such progress on the Sufi path that Mullah Shah would have named her his successor in the Qadiriyya, but the rules of the order did not allow this.

She wrote a biography of Moinuddin Chishti, the founder of the Chishti Order in India, titled Mu’nis al-Arwāḥ, as well as a biography of Mullah Shah, titled Risālah-i Ṣāḥibīyah, in which she also described her initiation by him. Her biography of Moinuddin Chishti is highly regarded for its judgment and literary quality. In it, she regarded him as having initiated her spiritually four centuries after his death, described her pilgrimage to Ajmer, and spoke of herself as a faqīrah to signify her vocation as a Sufi woman.

Jahanara Begum stated that she and her brother Dārā were the only descendants of Timur to embrace Sufism. However, Aurangzeb was spiritually trained as a follower of Sufism as well. As a patron of Sufi literature, she commissioned translations of and commentaries on many works of classical literature.

War of Succession

Shah Jahan fell seriously ill in 1657. A war of succession broke out among his four sons, Dara Shikoh, Shah Shuja, Aurangzeb and Murad Baksh.

During the war of succession, Jahanara supported her brother Dara Shikoh, the eldest son of Shah Jahan. When Dara Shikoh's generals sustained a defeat at Dharmat (1658) at the hands of Aurangzeb, Jahanara wrote a letter to Aurangzeb and advised him not to disobey his father and fight with his brother. She was unsuccessful. Dara was badly defeated in the Battle of Samugarh (29 May 1658), and fled towards Delhi.

Shah Jahan did everything he could, to stop the planned invasion of Agra. He asked Jahanara to use her feminine diplomacy to convince Murad and Shuja not to throw their weight on the side of Aurangzeb.

In June 1658, Aurangzeb besieged his father Shah Jahan in the Agra Fort, forcing him to surrender unconditionally, by cutting off the water supply. Jahanara came to Aurangzeb on 10 June, proposing a partition of the empire. Dara Shikoh would be given the Punjab and adjoining territories, Shuja would get Bengal, Murad would get Gujarat, Aurangzeb’s son Sultan Muhammad would get the Deccan, and the rest of the empire would go to Aurangzeb. Aurangzeb refused Jahanara’s proposition on the grounds that Dara Shikoh was an infidel.

On Aurangzeb's ascent to the throne, Jahanara joined her father in imprisonment at the Agra Fort, where she devoted herself to his care till his death in 1666.

After the death of their father, Jahanara and Aurangzeb reconciled. He gave her the title, Empress of Princesses, and she replaced Roshanara as the First Lady.

Jahanara was soon secure enough in her position to occasionally argue with Aurangzeb and she re-entered politics and was influential in various important matters and have certain special privileges which other women did not possess. She argued against Aurangzeb's strict regulation of public life in accordance with his conservative religious beliefs and his decision in 1679 to restore the poll tax on non-Muslims, which she believed would alienate his Hindu subjects.

Burial

Jahanara had her tomb built during her lifetime. It is constructed entirely of white marble with a screen of trellis work, open to the sky.

Upon her death, Aurangzeb gave her the posthumous title, Sahibat-uz-Zamani (Mistress of the Age). Jahanara is buried in a tomb in the Nizamuddin Dargah complex in New Delhi, which is considered "remarkable for its simplicity". The inscription on the tomb reads as follows:
Allah is the Living, the Sustaining.
Let no one cover my grave except with greenery,
For this very grass suffices as a tomb cover for the poor.
The mortal simplistic Princess Jahanara,
Disciple of the Khwaja Moin-ud-Din Chishti,
Daughter of Shah Jahan the Conqueror
May Allah illuminate his proof.
1092 [1681 AD]

Architectural legacy
Jahanara Begum's caravanserai that formed the original Chandni Chowk, from Sir Thomas Theophilus Metcalf's 1843 album.

In Agra, she is best known for sponsoring the building of the Jami Masjid or Friday Mosque in 1648, in the heart of the old city. The Mosque was funded entirely by Jahanara, using her personal allowance. She founded a madrasa, which was attached to the Jama Masjid, for the promotion of education.

She also made a significant impact on the landscape of the capital city of Shahjahanabad. Of the eighteen buildings in the city of Shahjahanabad commissioned by women, Jahanara commissioned five. All of Jahanara's building projects were completed around the year 1650, inside the city walls of Shahjahanabad. The best known of her projects was Chandni Chowk, the main street in the walled city of Old Delhi.

She constructed an elegant caravanserai on the East side of the street with gardens in the back. Herbert Charles Fanshawe, in 1902, mentions about the serai:

"Proceeding up the Chandni Chowk and passing many shops of the principal dealers in jewels, embroideries, and other products of Delhi handicrafts, the Northbrook Clock Tower and the principal entrance to the Queen's Gardens are reached. The former is situated at the site of the Karavan Sarai of the Princess Jahanara Begum (p. 239), known by the title of Shah Begum. The Sarai, the square in front of which projected across the street, was considered by Bernier one of the finest buildings in Delhi, and was compared by him with the Palais Royal, because of its arcades below and rooms with a gallery in front above."

The serai was later replaced by  a building, now known as the Town Hall, and the pool in the middle of the square was replaced by a grand clock tower (Ghantaghar).

In popular culture
Indian filmmaker F. R. Irani made Jahanara (1935), an early talkie film about her.
Her early life is depicted in The Royal Diaries book series as Jahanara: Princess of Princesses, India - 1627 by Kathryn Lasky.
Jahanara is the protagonist of the novel Beneath a Marble Sky (2013) by John Shors.
She is the main character in the novel Shadow Princess (2010) written by Indu Sundaresan.
Jahanara is also the main character in Jean Bothwell's An Omen for a Princess (1963).
She is also the protagonist in Ruchir Gupta's historical novel Mistress of the Throne (2014).
 Madhubala, Mala Sinha and Manisha Koirala have portrayed the role of Jahanara in their respective films, namely Mumtaz Mahal (1944), Jahan Ara (1964) and Taj Mahal: An Eternal Love Story (2005).
Jahanara is a main character of the 2017 alternate history novel  1636: Mission To The Mughals  and the 2021 follow up novel 1637: The Peacock Throne from the Ring of Fire Book series.
Jahan Ara is a main character of the 2022 Pakistani historical drama series "Badshah Begum" played by Zara Noor Abbas, produced by Momina Duraid and Rafay Rashidi under the banner of MD Productions, HumTv.

Ancestry

Literature

References

1614 births
1681 deaths
Mughal princesses
Indian women religious leaders
Indian Sufi saints
17th-century Indian women writers
17th-century Indian writers
Sufi poets
Indian people of Iranian descent
People from Agra
Islamic religious leaders
17th-century Indian women
17th-century Indian people
Scholars from Rajasthan
People from Ajmer
Educators from Rajasthan
Women educators from Rajasthan
Daughters of emperors